Pat Paterson (born Eliza Paterson; 10 April 1910 – 24 August 1978) was an English film actress. Although she made more than 20 films, she is best known as the wife of actor Charles Boyer.

Childhood and early life
Paterson was born on 10 April 1910 at No.74 Fitzgerald Street, Horton, a suburb of Bradford, West Riding of Yorkshire. Her mother, Hannah Holroyd (b. 4 February 1888, Bradford) was English, her father, John Robb Paterson (b. 1888, Kirkcaldy, Fife, Scotland) was a Scot. Eliza was the second of three children.

From infancy, Eliza was called Cis (to rhyme with kiss) or Cissie, a traditional English nickname given to girls named Elizabeth or some variant thereof (Eliza, Elspeth, etc.). By the time she was twelve years old she had built a portfolio of child-acting and modelling work in the local area.

She attended Newby Primary School in West Bowling, Bradford as a child.

Early Hollywood career

In 1928, although aged only 18 (the legal age of adulthood in the UK at that time was 21) she persuaded her parents to allow her to leave for Hollywood. She arrived in 1929 and was signed by Fox Studios as a contract player and immediately began to obtain film roles. She was renamed Patricia (almost immediately shortened to Pat) Paterson, as the Pat-Paterson sound had an ear-catching alliterative rhythm. 

From 1930 to 1934 she appeared in many studio pictures, in roles of increasing prominence. In the 1935 20th Century Fox film Charlie Chan Goes To Egypt, starring Warner Oland as Chan, she played the female lead, Carol Arnold. This was intended by the studio to serve as her break-out role for leading parts. In early 1934, as production on Charlie Chan Goes To Egypt was wrapping, Maurice Chevalier persuaded his lifelong best friend, fellow French actor Charles Boyer, to attend a Fox Studios post-New Year dinner party at which Pat Paterson was a guest. In interviews over the years, Boyer declared their meeting to have been a case of love at first sight. They married within four weeks of the party, on St. Valentine's Day, 14 February 1934, in Yuma, Arizona.

Later Hollywood career

Boyer was quoted in the American news media as claiming his wife would be relinquishing her career, as he felt married women should not work but devote their time and attention to bringing up their children. However, Paterson continued to work. Indeed, arguably her greatest commercial successes came in the five years immediately following her marriage to Boyer. She continued to appear in at least one film per year until the outbreak of World War II in 1939, when she and her husband, Charles Boyer, as Europeans, devoted themselves to supporting the war effort of Britain and France. It was the war which effectively brought an end to her film career. On 9 December 1943, two years after her husband Charles became an American citizen, she gave birth to their only child, Michael Charles Boyer, in Los Angeles.

Son's death
According to Associated Press reports, after midnight on 23 September 1965, Michael Charles Boyer, 21 years old, died of a single gunshot to his right temple at his Coldwater Canyon home.

Two witnesses, a house guest and his girlfriend were present in the home.  His girlfriend had just told him that she did not want to see him any more.  Michael replied that he could not live without her and called himself a "loser". 

He then went into the den and a single gunshot was heard. Subsequent news reports said that earlier, Michael had shot out a window in his home while playing Russian roulette, thus raising the possibility that his death was an accident. At the time, Charles Boyer was filming in Paris and returned to Los Angeles after he phoned his wife and was told of the incident.

Death
Diagnosed with cancer, Paterson died in Phoenix, Arizona on 24 August 1978. Charles Boyer died by suicide two days later, by drug overdose.

Filmography

References

Sources

External links

Photographs of Pat Paterson

English film actresses
English people of Scottish descent
Actresses from Bradford
Burials at Holy Cross Cemetery, Culver City
Deaths from cancer in Arizona
1910 births
1978 deaths
Actresses from Yorkshire
English expatriates in the United States
20th-century English actresses